Gantenbein is a surname. Notable people with the surname include:

Burkhard Gantenbein (1912–2007, Swiss field handball player 
Joe Gantenbein (1915–1993), American baseball player
Milt Gantenbein (1910–1988), American football player
Sandra Gantenbein (born c. 1984), Swiss curler
Talina Gantenbein (born 1998), Swiss freestyle skier

See also
Gantenbein, a 1964 novel